Novie McCabe (born December 15, 2001) is an American cross-country skier.

Career
McCabe made her World Cup debut in November 2021, in Rukatunturi, Finland, finishing 61st in the classical sprint.

Her best World Cup finish is seventh, in the 10 km mass start in Val di Fiemme, Italy, in January 2022.

She represented the United States at the 2022 Winter Olympics in Beijing, China.

Personal life
She is the daughter of former cross-country skier Laura McCabe.

Her idol growing up was Swedish cross-country skier Charlotte Kalla.

Cross-country skiing results
All results are sourced from the International Ski Federation (FIS).

Olympic Games

World Cup

Season standings

References

External links
 

2001 births
Living people
People from Okanogan County, Washington
Sportspeople from Washington (state)
American female cross-country skiers
Tour de Ski skiers
Olympic cross-country skiers of the United States
21st-century American women
Cross-country skiers at the 2022 Winter Olympics